The Reformed and Presbyterian Churches Fellowship in Myanmar (RPCFM) is a national ecumenical organization, bringing together Presbyterian and continental reformed Protestants incorporated in Myanmar.

History 
In 2005, a group of 10 Presbyterian and Continental Reformed denominations created the Fraternity of Presbyterian and Reformed Churches in Myanmar (FIPRM).

In 2008, the Society applied to join International Conference of Reformed Churches.

In addition, the organization has established contact with the Reformed Churches in the Netherlands (Liberated).

By 2013, the organization became a member of World Reformed Fellowship, as well as most of its member churches.

Members 

In 2008, there were 10 members of the Fraternity:
Reformed Community Church of Myanmar
Evangelical Presbyterian Church of Myanmar
Christian Reformed Church in Myanmar
Reformed Evangelical Church of Myanmar
Biblical Presbyterian Church of Myanmar
Reformed Presbyterian Church in Myanmar
Covenant Reformed Presbyterian Church of Myanmar
Reformed Church in Myanmar
United Reformed Churches in Myanmar
Reformed Baptist Churches in Myanmar

References 

Presbyterianism in Myanmar